Everett's thrush (Zoothera everetti) is a species of bird in the family Turdidae.  The name commemorates British colonial administrator and zoological collector Alfred Hart Everett.

Distribution and habitat
The thrush is endemic to the island of Borneo where it has been recorded only from the mountains of Sabah and northern Sarawak in eastern Malaysia. Its natural habitat is subtropical or tropical moist montane forests.  It is threatened by habitat loss.

References

Zoothera
Birds of East Malaysia
Endemic birds of Borneo
Birds described in 1892
Taxonomy articles created by Polbot
Fauna of the Borneo montane rain forests